Poręby  is a village in the administrative district of Gmina Jedlicze, within Krosno County, Podkarpackie Voivodeship, in south-eastern Poland.

References

Villages in Krosno County